Giorgos Mouratidis 1 January 1927 – 30 April 2013) was a Greek professional footballer who played as a midfielder.

Club career
Mouratidis started his career in 1945 at Apollon Kalamarias. In 1947 he moved to PAOK alongside Karpozilos and Konstantinidis. With PAOK he won 2 Macedonia FCA Championships. He played there until 1951, when he was transferred to AEK Athens, where he retired from 1955.

One of the greatest moments of his career was the 4 goals he scored in a cup match against Aris.

International career
Mouratidis played with Greece, having 8 appearances between 1948 and 1954. Of these, 6 took place when he was playing for PAOK and the other 2 being a player for AEK. He was also part of Greece's team for their qualification matches for the 1954 FIFA World Cup. He also played with the military team and won the World Military Cup in 1952.

Honours

PAOK
Macedonia FCA Championship: 1948, 1950

Greece military
World Military Cup: 1952

References

External links

1927 births
2013 deaths
Greek footballers
Greece international footballers
Association football midfielders
Footballers from Thessaloniki
Apollon Pontou FC players
PAOK FC players
AEK Athens F.C. players